Premont High School is a public high school located in Premont Texas (USA) and classified as a 2A school by the UIL. It is part of the Premont Independent School District located in southern Jim Wells County and eastern Duval County serving the students of Premont and surrounding area. In 2015, the school was rated "Improvement Required" by the Texas Education Agency.

Athletics
The Premont Cowboys compete in these sports - 

Baseball
Basketball
Cross Country
Golf
Tennis
Track and Field
Volleyball

Football and other sports were suspended by the district in 2012 due to low academic ratings   Most sports have returned except for football which only plays up to the junior high level.

State Titles
Boys Cross Country 
1998(2A), 1999(2A), 2000(2A), 2001(2A), 2002(2A)

Notable alumni

J. M. Lozano (1998), Republican member of the Texas House of Representatives from Kleberg, Jim Wells, Bee, and San Patricio counties. He was first elected in 2010.
Teresa Lozano Long, philanthropist. She was awarded the National Humanities Medal in 2019.

References

External links
Premont ISD

Public high schools in Texas
Jim Wells County, Texas
Schools in Jim Wells County, Texas